This is a list of government-sanctioned holidays commemorating individuals.

Individuals
Holiday